The docks and sorrels, genus Rumex, are a genus of about 200 species of annual, biennial, and perennial herbs in the buckwheat family, Polygonaceae.
Members of this genus are very common perennial herbs with a native almost worldwide distribution, and introduced species growing in the few places where the genus is not native.

Some are nuisance weeds (and are sometimes called dockweed or dock weed), but some are grown for their edible leaves. Rumex species are used as food plants by the larvae of a number of Lepidoptera species, and are the only host plants of Lycaena rubidus.

Description
They are erect plants, usually with long taproots. The fleshy to leathery leaves form a basal rosette at the root. The basal leaves may be different from those near the inflorescence. They may or may not have stipules. Minor leaf veins occur. The leaf blade margins are entire or crenate.

The usually inconspicuous flowers are carried above the leaves in clusters. The fertile flowers are mostly hermaphrodites, or they may be functionally male or female. The flowers and seeds grow on long clusters at the top of a stalk emerging from the basal rosette; in many species, the flowers are green, but in some (such as sheep's sorrel, Rumex acetosella) the flowers and their stems may be brick-red. Each seed is a three-sided achene, often with a round tubercle on one or all three sides.

Taxonomy
The genus was first described by Carl Linnaeus in 1753. Within the family Polygonaceae, it is placed in the subfamily Polygonoideae. The genus Emex was separated from Rumex by Francisco Campderá in 1819 on the basis that it was polygamous (i.e. had both bisexual and unisexual flowers on the same plant). However, some species of Rumex subg. Acetosa also have this characteristic, and most other features that are supposed to distinguish Emex are found in species of Rumex. Accordingly, in 2015, Schuster et al. demoted Emex to a subgenus of Rumex.

Within the subfamily Polygonoideae, Rumex is placed in the tribe Rumiceae, along with the two genera Oxyria and Rheum. It is most closely related to Rheum, which includes Rhubarb.

Species

, Plants of the World Online accepted the following species. A large number of hybrids are also recorded.

Rumex abyssinicus Jacq.
Rumex acetosa L. – sorrel, common sorrel, garden sorrel, narrow-leaved dock, spinach dock
Rumex acetosella L. – sheep's sorrel, common sheep sorrel, field sorrel, red sorrel
Rumex aegyptiacus L.
Rumex aeroplaniformis Eig
Rumex albescens Hillebr. – Oahu dock
Rumex alcockii Rech.f.
Rumex algeriensis Barratte & Murb.
Rumex alpinus L. – alpine dock, monk's rhubarb
Rumex altissimus Alph.Wood – pale dock, smooth dock, peach-leaf dock
Rumex alveolatus Losinsk.
Rumex amanus Rech.f.
Rumex amurensis F.Schmidt ex Maxim
Rumex andinus Rech.f.
Rumex angulatus Rech.f.
Rumex angustifolius Campd.
Rumex aquaticiformis Rech.f.
Rumex aquaticus L. – western dock, Scottish dock
Rumex aquitanicus Rech.f.
Rumex arcticus Trautv.
Rumex arcuatoramosus Rech.f.
Rumex argentinus Rech.f.
Rumex arifolius All.
Rumex aristidis Coss.
Rumex armenus K.Koch
Rumex atlanticus Coss. ex Batt.
Rumex aureostigmatica Kom.
Rumex azoricus Rech.f.
Rumex balcanicus Rech.f.
Rumex beringensis Jurtzev & V.V.Petrovsky – Bering Sea dock
Rumex bidens R.Br.
Rumex bipinnatus L.f.
Rumex bithynicus Rech.f.
Rumex brachypodus Rech.f.
Rumex brasiliensis Link
Rumex britannica L.
Rumex brownii Campd. – Browne's dock
Rumex bryhnii Snogerup
Rumex bucephalophorus L. – red dock
Rumex californicus Rech.f.
Rumex caucasicus Rech.f.
Rumex chalepensis Mill.

Rumex chrysocarpos Moris
Rumex confertus Willd. – Asiatic dock
Rumex conglomeratus Murray – clustered dock, sharp dock
Rumex cordatus Poir.
Rumex costaricensis Rech.f.
Rumex crassus Rech.f.
Rumex crispellus Rech.f.
Rumex crispissimus Kuntze
Rumex crispus L. – curled dock, curly dock, yellow dock, sour dock, narrow dock, garden patience, narrow-leaved dock
Rumex cristatus DC.
Rumex crystallinus Lange – shiny dock
Rumex cuneifolius Campd.
Rumex cyprius Murb.
Rumex darwinianus Rech.f.
Rumex densiflorus Osterh. – dense-flower dock, dense-flowered dock
Rumex dentatus L. – toothed dock
Rumex dregeanus Meisn.
Rumex drummondii Meisn.
Rumex dumosus A.Cunn. ex Meisn. – wiry dock
Rumex elbrusensis Boiss.
Rumex ellipticus Greene
Rumex ephedroides Bornm.
Rumex evenkiensis Elis.
Rumex fascicularis Small
Rumex fischeri Rchb.
Rumex flexicaulis Rech.f.
Rumex flexuosus Sol. ex G.Forst.
Rumex floridanus Meisn.
Rumex frutescens Thouars – wedgeleaf dock
Rumex fueginus Phil.
Rumex gangotrianus Aswal & S.K.Srivast.
Rumex garipensis Meisn.
Rumex giganteus W.T.Aiton – pawale
Rumex ginii Jahandiez & Maire
Rumex gmelinii Turcz. ex Ledeb.
Rumex gracilescens Rech.f.
Rumex graminifolius Georgi ex Lamb. – grassleaf sorrel
Rumex hastatulus Baldwin – heartwing dock, heartwing sorrel
Rumex hastatus D.Don
Rumex hesperius Greene
Rumex hultenii Tzvelev
Rumex hydrolapathum Huds. – great water dock
Rumex hymenosepalus Torr. – canaigre, canaigre dock
Rumex hypogaeus T.M.Schust. & Reveal
Rumex inconspicuus Rech.f.
Rumex induratus Boiss. & Reut.
Rumex intermedius DC.
Rumex jacutensis Kom.
Rumex japonicus Houtt.
Rumex kandavanicus (Rech.f.) Rech.f.
Rumex kerneri Borbás – Kerner's dock
Rumex komarovii Schischk. & Serg.
Rumex krausei Jurtzev & V.V.Petrovsky – Krause's sorrel
Rumex lacustris Greene
Rumex lanceolatus Thunb.
Rumex lapponicus (Hiitonen) Czernov
Rumex lativalvis Meisn.
Rumex leptocaulis Brandbyge & Rech.f.
Rumex limoniastrum Jaub. & Spach
Rumex longifolius DC. – dooryard dock, northern dock
Rumex lorentzianus Lindau
Rumex lunaria L.
Rumex madaio Makino
Rumex maderensis Lowe
Rumex magellanicus Campd.
Rumex maricola J.Rémy
Rumex maritimus L. – golden dock, bristle dock, seashore dock
Rumex marschallianus Rchb.
Rumex mexicanus Meisn.
Rumex microcarpus Campd.
Rumex nebroides Campd.

Rumex neglectus Kirk
Rumex nematopodus Rech.f. – Arizona dock
Rumex nepalensis Spreng.
Rumex nervosus Vahl
Rumex nivalis Hegetschw.
Rumex oblongifolius Tolm.
Rumex obovatus Danser – tropical dock
Rumex obtusifolius L. – broad-leaved dock, bitter dock, bluntleaf dock, butter dock
Rumex occidentalis S.Watson
Rumex occultans Sam.
Rumex olympicus Boiss.
Rumex orbiculatus A.Gray – great water dock
Rumex orthoneurus Rech.f. – Chiricahua mountain dock
Rumex pallidus Bigelow – seaside dock
Rumex palustris Sm. – marsh dock
Rumex papilio Coss. & Balansa
Rumex papillaris Boiss. & Reut.
Rumex paraguayensis D.Parodi – Paraguayan dock
Rumex patagonicus Rech.f.
Rumex patientia L. – patience dock, garden patience, monk's rhubarb
Rumex paucifolius Nutt. – alpine sheep's sorrel, few-leaved dock, meadow dock
Rumex paulsenianus Rech.f.
Rumex persicarioides L.
Rumex peruanus Rech.f.
Rumex pictus Forssk.
Rumex polycarpus Rech.f.
Rumex ponticus E.H.L.Krause
Rumex popovii Pachom.
Rumex praecox Rydb.
Rumex pseudonatronatus (Borbás) Murb. – field dock
Rumex pseudoxyria (Tolm.) Khokhr.
Rumex pulcher L. – fiddle dock
Rumex punjabensis K.M.Vaid & H.B.Naithani
Rumex pycnanthus Rech.f.
Rumex rectinervius Rech.f.
Rumex rhodesius Rech.f.
Rumex romassa Remy
Rumex roseus L.
Rumex rossicus Murb.
Rumex rugosus Campd.
Rumex rupestris Le Gall – shore dock
Rumex ruwenzoriensis Chiov.
Rumex sagittatus Thunb.
Rumex salicifolius Weinm. – willow dock, willow-leaved dock
Rumex sanguineus L. – wood dock, redvein dock
Rumex scutatus L. – French sorrel, leaf-shield sorrel
Rumex sellowianus Rech.f.
Rumex sibiricus Hultén – Siberian dock
Rumex similans Rech.f.
Rumex simpliciflorus Murb.
Rumex skottsbergii O.Deg. & I.Deg. – lava dock
Rumex songaricus Fisch. & C.A.Mey.
Rumex spathulatus Thunb.
Rumex spinosus L.
Rumex spiralis Small – winged dock
Rumex stenoglottis Rech.f.
Rumex stenophyllus Ledeb.
Rumex subarcticus Lepage
Rumex suffruticosus J.Gay ex Meisn.
Rumex tenax Rech.f.
Rumex thjanschanicus Losinsk.
Rumex thyrsiflorus Fingerh.
Rumex thyrsoides Desf.
Rumex tmoleus Boiss.
Rumex tolimensis Wedd.
Rumex transitorius Rech.f.
Rumex triangulivalvis (Danser) Rech.f.
Rumex trisetifer Stokes
Rumex tuberosus L.
Rumex tunetanus Barratte & Murb.
Rumex turcomanicus (Rech.f.) Czerep.
Rumex ucranicus Fisch. ex Spreng.
Rumex ujskensis Rech.f.
Rumex uruguayensis Rech.f.
Rumex usambarensis (Engl.) Dammer
Rumex utahensis Rech.f.
Rumex venosus Pursh – veiny dock, sand dock
Rumex verticillatus L. – swamp dock, water dock
Rumex vesicarius L. – bladder dock
Rumex violascens Rech.f. – violet dock
Rumex woodii N.E.Br.
Rumex yungningensis Sam.

Uses

These plants have many uses. Broad-leaved dock (Rumex obtusifolius) used to be called butter dock because its large leaves were used to wrap and conserve butter.

Rumex hymenosepalus has been cultivated in the Southwestern US as a source of tannin (roots contain up to 25%), for use in leather tanning, while leaves and stems are used for a mordant-free mustard-colored dye.

These plants are edible. The leaves of most species contain oxalic acid and tannin, and many have astringent and slightly purgative qualities. Some species with particularly high levels of oxalic acid are called sorrels (including sheep's sorrel Rumex acetosella, common sorrel Rumex acetosa, and French sorrel Rumex scutatus), and some of these are grown as leaf vegetables or garden herbs for their acidic taste.

In the United Kingdom, Rumex obtusifolius is often found growing near stinging nettles, owing to both species favouring a similar environment, and there is a widely held belief that the underside of the dock leaf, squeezed to extract a little juice, can be rubbed on the skin to counteract the itching caused by brushing against a nettle plant. This home remedy is not supported by any science, although it is possible that the act of rubbing may act as a distracting counterstimulation, or that belief in the dock's effect may provide a placebo effect.

In traditional Austrian medicine, R. alpinus leaves and roots have been used internally for treatment of viral infections.

Rumex nepalensis is also has a variety of medicinal uses in the Greater Himalayas, including Sikkim in Northeastern India.

Fossil record
Several fossil fruits of Rumex sp. have been described from middle Miocene strata of the Fasterholt area near Silkeborg in Central Jutland, Denmark.
 One fossil fruit of a Rumex species has been extracted from a borehole sample of the Middle Miocene fresh water deposits in Nowy Sacz Basin, West Carpathians, Poland. This fossil fruit is similar to the fruits of the extant species Rumex maritimus and Rumex ucranicus which both have fossil records from the Pliocene and Pleistocene of Europe.

Nutrition

Nutrition information is shown in the infobox on the right.

See also
 Antipruritic

References

External links

Rumex acetosella; Missouri Botanical Garden's efloras.org.
Edibility of Dock: Identification and edible parts of Rumex spp.
Video:- Dock (Rumex) As Wild Edible Food Part 1 | Frank Cook
 
 

 
Polygonaceae genera
Taxa named by Carl Linnaeus
Taxa described in 1753